The Armed Forces Tribunal Act, 2007 was passed by the Parliament and led to the formation of Armed Forces Tribunal in India.

References 

Acts of the Parliament of India 2007
Military of India
2007 in law
2007 in India